Joe Lynch may refer to:

 Joe Lynch (boxer) (1898–1965), American world bantamweight champion
 Joe Lynch (actor) (1925–2001), Irish film actor
 Joe Lynch (director), American film and music video director
 Joe Lynch (Home and Away), fictional character on the Australian soap opera Home and Away
 Joe Lynch (footballer) (born 1999), English footballer

See also 
 Joseph Lynch (disambiguation)